Shyh Wang Hall（王适大楼), or Wang Hall, is a building on the University of California, Berkeley campus. Located in the Berkeley Hills, it houses supercomputers designed to process 2 quadrillion calculations per second each. It is in the building complex of the Lawrence Berkeley National Laboratory. It was designed by Perkins + Will of San Francisco and opened in November 2015. It houses the National Energy Research Scientific Computing Center.

References

External links
Shyh Wang Hall at LBL website

University of California, Berkeley buildings
Lawrence Berkeley National Laboratory
Supercomputer sites
Science and technology in the San Francisco Bay Area
2015 establishments in California